Phocomelia is a condition that involves malformations of human arms and legs. Although many factors can cause phocomelia, the prominent roots come from the use of the drug thalidomide and from genetic inheritance.

Occurrence in an individual results in various abnormalities to the face, limbs, ears, nose, vessels and many other underdevelopments. Although operations may improve some abnormalities, many are not surgically treatable due to the lack of nerves and other related structures.

The term is from Ancient Greek φώκη phōkē, "seal (animal)" + -o- interfix + μέλος melos, "limb" + English suffix -ia). Phocomelia is an extremely rare congenital disorder involving malformation of the limbs (dysmelia). Étienne Geoffroy Saint-Hilaire coined the term in 1836.

Signs and symptoms

The symptoms of phocomelia syndrome are undeveloped limbs and absent pelvic bones; however, various abnormalities can occur to the limbs and bones. Usually the upper limbs are not fully formed and sections of the "hands and arms may be missing". Short arm bones, fused fingers, and missing thumbs will often occur. Sometimes hands or fingers will be present but limp due to having no bones or being loosely attached. Legs and feet are also affected similarly to the arms and hands. Individuals with phocomelia will often lack thigh bones, and the hands or feet may be abnormally small or appear as stumps due to their close "attachment to the body".

According to National Organization for Rare Disorders (NORD), individuals carrying phocomelia syndrome will generally show symptoms of growth retardation previous to and after birth. The syndrome can also cause severe mental deficiencies in infants. Infants born with phocomelia will normally have a petite head with "sparse hair" that may appear "silvery-blonde". Hemangioma, the abnormal buildup of blood vessels, will possibly develop around the facial area at birth and the eyes may be set widely apart, a condition known as orbital hypertelorism. The pigment of the eyes will be a bluish white. Phocomelia can also cause: an undeveloped nose with slender nostrils, disfigured ears, irregularly petite jaws (a condition known as micrognathia), and a cleft lip with cleft palate. According to NORD, severe symptoms of phocomelia include:
 A fissure of the skull and a projecting brain known as encephalocele
 An accumulation of spinal fluid under the skull also known as hydrocephalus, causing vomiting and migraines
 An abnormally shaped uterus (bicornuate)
 Inability to clot blood efficiently due to a low amount of platelets running through the blood
 Malformations in the kidney and heart
 Shortened neck
 Abnormalities in the urethra

Thalidomide syndrome symptoms
When an individual is born with phocomelia due to drugs or pharmaceuticals, it is known as thalidomide syndrome. The symptoms of thalidomide syndrome are defined by absent or shortened limbs, causing flipper hands and feet. According to Anthony J Perri III and Sylvia Hsu they can additionally receive:
 Palsy disorder of the face
 Ear and eye abnormalities, resulting in limited/complete loss of hearing or sight
 Gastrointestinal and genitourinary tract disorders
 Ingrown genitalia
 Undeveloped/missing lungs
 Distorted digestive tract, heart, kidney
 Hypoplastic or absent bones

The infants that were exposed to thalidomide during development phases had a 40% chance of survival. The McMredie–McBride hypothesis explains that the limbs of the infants become malformed as a result of the thalidomide harming the neural tissue—simply because the neural tissue has such a large impact on formation and development of the limbs.

Causes

Thalidomide

Thalidomide was released onto the market in 1958 in West Germany under the name Contergan. Primarily prescribed as a sedative or hypnotic, thalidomide also claimed to cure "anxiety, insomnia, gastritis, and tension". Afterwards it was used against nausea and to alleviate morning sickness in pregnant women. Thalidomide became an over-the-counter drug in Germany around 1960, i.e. it could be bought without a prescription. Shortly after the drug was sold, in Germany between 5,000 and 7,000 infants were born with phocomelia. Only 40% of these children survived. 

Research also proves that although phocomelia did exist through the 1940s and 1950s, cases of severe phocomelia multiplied in the 1960s when thalidomide was released in Germany; the direct cause was traced to thalidomide. The statistic was given that "50 percent of the mothers with deformed children had taken thalidomide during the first trimester of pregnancy." Throughout Europe, Australia, and the United States, 10,000 cases were reported of infants with phocomelia; only 50% of the 10,000 survived. Thalidomide became effectively linked to death or severe disabilities among babies. Those subjected to thalidomide while in the womb experienced limb deficiencies in that the long limbs either were not developed or presented themselves as stumps. Other effects included deformed eyes, hearts, alimentary and urinary tracts, blindness and deafness.

Genetic inheritance
According to the National Organization for Rare Disorders (NORD), when phocomelia is transmitted (in its familial genetic form) it is seen as an autosomal recessive trait and the mutation is linked to chromosome 8.

A study of Roberts syndrome, a genetic disorder showing similar symptoms to phocomelia, has shed light on the possible causes. An individual afflicted with Roberts Syndrome will have chromosome copies that do not connect at the centromeres, making them unable to line up accordingly. As a result, the newly made cells contain an excess or reduced number of chromosomes. In both Roberts syndrome and phocomelia the cells cease to develop, or die, preventing proper development of the limbs, eyes, brain, palate, or other structures.

Treatment
Prosthesis is a synthetic alternative for missing limbs, teeth, and various other body parts. Advances in prosthetic limbs have increased greatly during the twentieth century. The use of new materials such as modern plastics, complex procedures and better pigments have created lighter in weight and more realistic looking artificial limbs. With the advancement of myoelectric prosthetic limbs, patients are able to move their limbs without the use of cords or other devices. The myoelectric limbs can detect electric signals from the nervous system and muscles. They were first used on adults, but now they are being fitted to children.

Patients that receive a loss of limbs due to phocomelia are typically treated with prosthetics. Infants at the age of six months are recommended to have a prosthetic mitten fitted, enabling them to get used to the prosthesis. A hook will be added when the child reaches the age of two years. Eventually the patient may receive a myoelectric prosthetic limb. Patients are treated in this way due to the lack of understanding at a young age and the absence of necessary tissues and bones to hold the prosthetic limb.

Notable cases
 Mat Fraser was born with phocomelia due to his mother taking thalidomide while she was pregnant. He is known as the drummer of rock bands including Fear of Sex, The Reasonable Strollers, Joyride, The Grateful Dub, and Living in Texas. He is also an actor and performing artist.
 Alison Lapper was born with phocomelia. She is arm deficient and has shortened bones and legs. Lapper graduated from Brighton University in 1994, established herself as a visual artist, and in 2000 gave birth to a son, Parys. Lapper produces cards and calendars for The Mouth and Foot Painters' Association. She does not wear prosthetic limbs.
 Ronan Tynan was born with phocomelia. He became a track and field athlete, competing in the 1984 and 1988 Summer Paralympics. Tynan went on to a career as a physician, and later, a singer.
 Ame Barnbrook was born without arms and only the lower half of her left leg, and three toes. She has a rarer form of phocomelia, meaning all of her limbs are affected. She graduated from the University of Wollongong with a Bachelor of Creative Arts. Barnbrook plays the trumpet with her foot and is a competitive sailor. She sails a SKUD18 at world championship level. She did not qualify for the 2012 Paralympic Games in London, but she trained for the 2016 Paralympic Games in Rio de Janeiro.
 Thomas Quasthoff, an opera singer.
 Nick Vujicic, evangelist, motivational speaker, author, and director of Life Without Limbs.
 Eli Bowen, who made his living performing in sideshows.
 Hee Ah Lee, a pianist who has two fingers on each hand.
 Rahma Haruna was born in Nigeria with severe phocomelia. She had no limbs, except for a partially formed right hand that was attached to her axilla. Rahma's story came out when a local journalist saw her on the street with her brother, after which the story was shared widely on social media. She died at the age of 19, on 25 December 2016.
 Enos Stutsman, Pioneer settler of North Dakota. Namesake of Stutsman County.
 Beknur Zhanibek is a Kazakh singer, born with phocomelia. He represented Kazakhstan in the Junior Eurovision Song Contest 2021.

References

External links 

 
Congenital disorders of musculoskeletal system